This is a list of the Spanish Singles number-ones of 1981.

Chart history

See also
1981 in music
List of number-one hits (Spain)
 List of number-one singles of the 1980s in Spain

References

1981
Spain Singles
Number-one singles